Horns or The Horns may refer to:

 Plural of Horn (instrument), a group of musical instruments all with a horn-shaped bells
 The Horns (Colorado), a summit on Cheyenne Mountain
 Horns (novel), a dark fantasy novel written in 2010 by Joe Hill
 Horns (film), a 2013 film adaptation of Hill's novel
 "The Horns" (song), a 2015 song by DJ Katch
 The Horns, Bull's Green, a pub in Hertfordshire, England
 Texas Longhorns, the sports teams of the University of Texas in Austin; sometimes shortened to "Horns"

See also
 
 Sign of the horns, a vulgar hand gesture